Raymond Clinton Cole (August 21, 1870 – February 8, 1957) was an American lawyer and politician who served three terms a U.S. Representative from Ohio from 1919 to 1925. He was the brother of Ralph Dayton Cole, who also served in  Congress.

Biography 
Born in Biglick Township, near Findlay, Ohio, Cole attended the common schools and Findlay College, Findlay, Ohio.
He taught school nine years.
He was graduated from the law department of Ohio Northern University at Ada in 1900.
He was admitted to the bar of Ohio the same year and commenced practice in Findlay, Ohio, in 1901.
He served as member of the Ohio National Guard 1903-1913.
He served as city solicitor 1912-1916.

Cole was elected as a Republican to the Sixty-sixth, Sixty-seventh, and Sixty-eighth Congresses (March 4, 1919 – March 3, 1925).
He served as chairman of the Committee on Elections No. 1 (Sixty-eighth Congress).
He was an unsuccessful candidate for reelection in 1924 to the Sixty-ninth Congress.
He resumed the practice of law.
He died in Findlay, Ohio, on February 8, 1957.
He was interred in Bright Cemetery.

Sources

1870 births
1957 deaths
People from Findlay, Ohio
University of Findlay alumni
Claude W. Pettit College of Law alumni
Ohio lawyers
Ohio National Guard personnel
Republican Party members of the United States House of Representatives from Ohio